Elia Antonio Liut (Fiume Veneto, March 6, 1894 - Quito, May 12, 1952) was an Italian aviator who was the first to fly across the Andes of Ecuador on the 4th of November of 1920, where he is regarded as a national hero.

Biography

His parents were Felice Liut and Teresa Giust; he was the second of eight children. At the age of 10 Liut moved to Argentina  with his father and younger brother; he remained in the South American nation for 8 years before returning to Italy.

Liut was 20 when in 1914 World War I broke out in Europe. He joined the military, and after basic training, he asked to join its air force. He got his pilot’s license in 1915, and partook in many aerial missions and battles throughout Europe.

Liut is known for being the first to cross the Andes by air.

After settling in Ecuador he married Carmela Angulo from Quito.

First Trans-Andean Flight

Liut’s move to Ecuador began when the consul of Ecuador in Rome, Miguel Valverde Letamendi, invited him to Ecuador to help it develop its aviation program. At the same time, the owner of the Ecuadorian newspaper "El Telégrafo", José Abel Castillo, was looking for a way to increase the number of subscribers to his paper. When Castillo found out that Liut was invited to Ecuador, he hired Liut, and his mechanic Giovanni Fedelli, and took on the costs associated with bringing a plane from Italy to Guayaquil. It was Castillo’s idea to utilize the plane to distribute his newspaper daily throughout other parts of Ecuador.

In July 1920, Elia Liut arrived in Guayaquil accompanied by two mechanics, Giovanni Fedelli and Giovanni Ancilloto. The plane they brought with them, the Macchi-Henrit HO, had the name “Telégrafo I” painted on it. They test flew the plane in Guayaquil successfully, and this became national news. It was then that the Centennial Board of Cuenca asked Liut to perform a flight exhibition in Cuenca as they celebrated their 100th year of independence.

The Centennial Board began thinking of ways to get the plane from the coastal city of Guayaquil to the mountainous city of Cuenca. The original plan was to dismantle the plane and transport it from Guayaquil to Huigra via the railroad, and from there to Cuenca by human strength. Liut thought the idea was awful and expressed to the Board that the best way to get the plane from Guayaquil to Cuenca was to fly.

Once Castillo gave his permission for the flight, the date of the flight was set for November 3, 1920. They then defined what course to take, and informed journalists what route they would take so that each town they flew over would know when to look out for the plane, and they also flattened some land so that the plane could land when it arrived at its destination. But on the day of the flight, bad weather conditions precluded the plane from taking off, and the flight rescheduled to the next day.

That is how the Telégrafo I flew out of Guayaquil on November 4, 1920 at 10:30am and arrived about an hour later in Cuenca. The plane was met in Cuenca by thousands of its residents who had come to watch the plane land, they waved their handkerchiefs and hats.

He was then taken by the crowd to the city center, where he was acclaimed and recognized as the "Conqueror of the Andes", and also proclaimed the “Andean Condor”. According to his own words it was "... the most lovely and honorary title I have yet had in my life ...".

Notes 

1894 births
1952 deaths
Italian aviators
Italian expatriates in Argentina